Sheepwash Channel connects the River Thames to the west and the Castle Mill Stream next to the Oxford Canal to the east (linked through Isis Lock), in west Oxford, England. To the north are Cripley Meadow (largely allotments) and Fiddler's Island. To the south are Osney Island and the Botley Road.

The Cherwell Valley Line and Cotswold Line cross the channel just north of Oxford railway station on Sheepwash Channel Railway Bridge. Just to the east, there is Rewley Road Swing Bridge, a swing bridge for the former Buckinghamshire Railway line of London and North Western Railway, that used to serve the Oxford Rewley Road railway station, which was on the site of the Saïd Business School. Rewley Road Bridge also crosses Sheepwash Channel.

The Isis Lock just to the north of the eastern end of Sheepwash Channel connects the Castle Mill Stream and the Oxford Canal, allowing access between the Oxford Canal and the River Thames via the channel for boats. At the western end is a footbridge over Sheepwash Channel, forming part of the Thames Path.

Gallery

References

Year of establishment missing
Geography of Oxford
Transport in Oxford
Rivers of Oxfordshire
Canals in England
Oxford Canal
CSheepwash